Pulse of the City is an American television anthology drama series on the now-defunct DuMont Television Network. The series ran from September 15, 1953, to March 9, 1954. The directors of the dramas included Robert Altman.

Episode status
Three episodes are in the collection of the UCLA Film and Television Archive.

See also
List of programs broadcast by the DuMont Television Network
List of surviving DuMont Television Network broadcasts

References

Bibliography
David Weinstein, The Forgotten Network: DuMont and the Birth of American Television (Philadelphia: Temple University Press, 2004) 
Alex McNeil, Total Television, Fourth edition (New York: Penguin Books, 1980) 
Tim Brooks and Earle Marsh, The Complete Directory to Prime Time Network TV Shows, Third edition (New York: Ballantine Books, 1964)

External links
 
 DuMont historical website

DuMont Television Network original programming
1950s American anthology television series
1953 American television series debuts
1954 American television series endings
Black-and-white American television shows
1950s American drama television series
English-language television shows